Pyratula is a genus of flies belonging to the family Keroplatidae.

The species of this genus are found in Europe.

Species:
 Pyratula alpicola Chandler & Blasco-Zumeta, 2001 
 Pyratula canariae Chandler & Ribeiro, 1995

References

Keroplatidae